Edwin Hughes (1885–1949) was a Welsh international footballer who also played for Wrexham, Nottingham Forest and Manchester City.

References

1885 births
1949 deaths
Welsh footballers
Association football defenders
Wales international footballers
Manchester City F.C. players
Wrexham A.F.C. players
Nottingham Forest F.C. players
Wrexham Victoria F.C. players